Atkins is an unincorporated community in the town of Hiles, Forest County, Wisconsin, United States. The community was likely named for Hubbard C. Atkins, the superintendent of the Prairie du Chien & La Crosse railroad in the 1880s.

References

Unincorporated communities in Forest County, Wisconsin
Unincorporated communities in Wisconsin